"Les Bras en croix" is a song by French singer Johnny Hallyday, released in 1963.

The song was included on Hallyday's 1963 album Johnny Hallyday (commonly known as Les Bras en croix).

Commercial performance 
In France the song reached no. 1 on the singles sales chart.

In Wallonia (Belgium) it spent 28 weeks in the chart, peaking at no. 6 for one week.

Track listing 
7-inch EP Philips 432.908 BE (1963, France, Spain, etc.)
A1. "Les bras en croix" (2:13)
A2. "Quitte-moi doucement" ("Break It to Me Gently") (2:30)
B1. "Quand un air vous possède" ("When My Little Girl Is Smiling") (2:17)
B2. "Dis-moi oui" ("We Say Yeah") (2:07)

Charts 

 Charted in Belgium as "Les Bras en croix / Quand un air vous possède"

References 

1963 songs
1963 EPs
Johnny Hallyday songs

Number-one singles in France
Rock-and-roll songs
Songs written by Jil & Jan
Songs written by Johnny Hallyday